Enrique Santiago Petracchi (16 November 1935 – 12 October 2014) was an Argentine lawyer, judge and a member of Supreme Court of Argentina.

History
Petracchi is the son of Enrique Carlos Petracchi, who was procurator to the Argentine Treasury and Procurator General. Enrique Santiago Petracchi studied law at the University of Buenos Aires, taking further studies at Tulane University in New Orleans in 1961. He has spent his entire legal career in the justice system, first appointed as a legal assistant in 1955.

Supreme Court
In 1983 the new democratic government of Raúl Alfonsín appointed Petracchi to the Supreme Court of Argentina, the only Peronist supporter to be appointed at that point. 

From September 1989, following the resignation of José Severo Caballero, he served as President of the Court for nine months. From 2004 until 2006 he was again President of the Court, supported by all but one of his fellow Supreme Court Justices. Adolfo Vázquez was the only dissenting voice. 

His presidency was a period of opening up the court and increasing its transparency, including publishing judgements on the internet.

References 

1935 births
Lawyers from Buenos Aires
2014 deaths
20th-century Argentine judges
Supreme Court of Argentina justices
21st-century Argentine judges